This is a list of mayors (Bürgermeister) of the city of Linz, Austria.

Austrian Empire
1821–1848: Joseph Bischoff
1848–1854: Reinhold Körner
1854–1854: Johann Heinrich Jungwirth
1854–1856: Josef Dierzer von Traunthal
1856–1861: Vinzenz Fink
1861–1867: Reinhold Körner

Austro-Hungarian Empire 
1867–1873: Viktor Drouot
1873–1885: Karl Wiser
1885–1894: Johann Evangelist Wimhölzel
1894–1900: Franz Poche
1900–1907: Gustav Eder
1907–1918: Franz Dinghofer

First Republic 
1919–1927: Josef Dametz
1927–1929: Robert Mehr
1929–1930: Eduard Euller
1930–1934: Josef Gruber

Anschluss 
1938–1940: Sepp Wolkerstorfer
1940–1944: Leopold Sturma
1944–1945: Franz Langoth

Second Republic 
1945–1962: Ernst Koref
1962–1968: Edmund Aigner
1968–1969: Theodor Grill
1969–1984: Franz Hillinger
1984–1988: Hugo Schanovsky
1988–2013: Franz Dobusch
2013–present: Klaus Luger

References

See also
 Timeline of Linz

Linz
Linz